Raymond Martin may refer to:

Raymond Martin (academic) (1926–2020), Australian chemistry professor and university administrator
Raymond Martin (wheelchair athlete) (born 1992), American wheelchair racer
Raymond Martin (canoeist) (born 1960), Australian sprint canoeist
Raymond Martin (cyclist) (born 1949), French former road bicycle racer

See also
 Ramón Martí, 13th-century friar and theologian
 Ray Martin (disambiguation)